Stoke-on-Trent is a city in Staffordshire, England.  Known as The Potteries and is the home of the pottery industry in the United Kingdom.  Formed in 1910 from six towns, the city has almost 200 listed buildings within the city.  Many of these are connected with the pottery industry and the people involved with it.

The term "listed building", in the United Kingdom, refers to a building or structure designated as being of special architectural, historical, or cultural significance under the Planning (Listed Buildings and Conservation Areas) Act 1990. They are categorised in three grades: Grade I consists of buildings of outstanding architectural or historical interest, Grade II* includes significant buildings of more than local interest and Grade II consists of buildings of special architectural or historical interest. Buildings in England are listed by the Secretary of State for Culture, Media and Sport on recommendations provided by English Heritage, which also determines the grading.

Key

Listed buildings and structures

References

History of Staffordshire
Stoke
Buildings and structures in Stoke-on-Trent